Krishnancoil is a suburb in Nagercoil, in the District of Kanyakumari, Tamil Nadu, India, named after the temple of Krishna situated within. It was built 1000 years ago.

Geography 
It is situated on  National Highway 944 (India), which connects Nagercoil with Tirunelveli and Trivandrum, the capital city of Kerala. The pond adjacent to the temple (known in Tamil as "Theppakulam") has two "pipal trees" on its banks, one each on the west and south sides.

Culture 
The Krishnan temple at Krishnancoil is described as  " The Guruvayoor of South " as the chief deity is visually similar to the one in the Guruvayoor temple. It connects the realistic tradition of Hindu mysticism to local folklore and happens to be a premiere spot for local devotees to show up and present their prayers. The temple is well maintained, and was renovated in 2008 for Kumbabhishekam which took place after many decades. 

The annual ten-day temple festival is conducted during the Tamil month of Chithirai, which falls between 14 April and 14 May. Krishna is  the childhood avatar of this temple.

Krishnancoil IraiThondil Ilaignargal Trust plays a vital role in this place by enlisting volunteers and conducting Vilakku Pooja annually during AAVANI. This trust was inclusive of major castes.

Education 
A Government middle school is located there.

Economy 
Most of the people in the area work in the offices of the Nagercoil town or in agriculture.  The main crop is rice.

Transport 
The railway station situated in this suburb is called Nagercoil Town, and the main railway station of Nagercoil is called Nagercoil Junction. Krishnancoil is nearer to vadasery police station.

Infrastructure

A drinking water filtration plant situated there is popularly known as "filter house" which filters the drinking water from Mukkadal dam to Nagercoil town and surrounding areas.

Demographics

The majority population of Krishnancoil belongs to the Tamil Brahmins and Vellalar, Vviswakarma, Muthaliyar, Vannar, Vaaniyar, Christians, and Muslims followed by Krishnanvaka and Nairs.

Notable people

 K. V. Mahadevan (who had tuned music for Devar Films such as Thaikku pin Thaaram, Thaai sollai thattaathe, Thaayaik kaaththa thanayan, Dharmam Thalai Kaakkum, Neethikku pin Paasam, Kudumba thalaivan)

Kanyakumari